Akua Naru (also known as Akua Olatunji), is a rapper from Connecticut, United States. Naru has been particularly successful in Europe, where she has lived since 2008. Her hip-hop music incorporates  styles including soul and jazz. In 2018 she began archiving the achievements of women in hip-hop at Harvard University as a Nasir Jones Hip-hop Fellow at the Hip-hop Archive Research Institute.

Life
Naru was born and raised in Connecticut in a family that went to church and played gospel music. At the age of nine, Naru's uncle introduced her to hip hop music. It was Akua's grandmother who took her to church, where she met strong, assertive women in the community, which led to her interest in the revolutionary ideas of Angela Davis, Malcolm X and Assata Shakur.

By the time Naru completed her formal education at Rutgers University and the University of Pennsylvania, she had learned her skills as a member of a repertory company where she was able to use recording equipment and perform publicly. Akua left the U.S. to travel to China, ultimately moving to Cologne, Germany, in 2011, where she created her first album "The Journey Aflame" which was produced by "The Drumkidz". Later that year Naru returned to the USA on a 22-date tour. Naru's work is inspired by Toni Morrison and the history of Black women in the United States. Akua Naru has been a guest speaker at universities throughout the US, Germany, Nigeria, Tanzania, Kenya, and Sudan. She has performed on the continents of North America, South America, Europe, and Africa.

Discography

EP
 2011 : Poetry: How Does It Feel?

Albums
 2011 : The Journey Aflame
 2012 : The Live & Aflame Sessions
 2015 : The Miner's Canary
 2018 : The Blackest Joy

References

Year of birth missing (living people)
Living people
American women singers
American women rappers
21st-century American rappers
21st-century American women musicians
21st-century women rappers